Mohamed Moussa El Dib (original name: محمد موسى الديب, born ) is an Egyptian male weightlifter, competing in the 94 kg category and representing Egypt at international competitions. He participated at the 2000 Summer Olympics in the 94 kg event. He competed at world championships, most recently at the 2003 World Weightlifting Championships.

Major results

References

External links
 

1977 births
Living people
Egyptian male weightlifters
Weightlifters at the 2000 Summer Olympics
Olympic weightlifters of Egypt
Place of birth missing (living people)
Mediterranean Games silver medalists for Egypt
Mediterranean Games medalists in weightlifting
Competitors at the 2001 Mediterranean Games
20th-century Egyptian people
21st-century Egyptian people